Detroit Lake is a reservoir impounded by the Detroit Dam on the North Santiam River  southeast of Salem, Oregon, United States.
The lake is adjacent to Oregon Route 22 near the city of Detroit.
This mesotrophic lake stores water for use by the city of Salem and other nearby communities.

History

Detroit Lake is situated over a historical road bed of the former Oregon Pacific Railroad.  This route was built by Colonel T. Egenton Hogg as a proposed transcontinental railroad.  Because of a lack of funding, the line terminated in Idanha, southeast of the lake.  Idanha had rail service until the 1950s, when the track was removed for installation of the Detroit and Big Cliff reservoirs. Detroit Lake was created in 1953 after the completion of the dam. Part of the Willamette Valley Projects, the lake was intended primarily for flood control and power generation but has become one of the major recreation resources in western Oregon.

Details

One swimming opportunity is at the Mongold Day-Use Area (an Oregon State Park).
Detroit Lake is stocked by the Oregon Department of Fish and Wildlife with 125,000 catchable rainbow trout along with fingerling rainbow, kokanee and chinook salmon. 
A self-sustaining population of brown bullhead catfish resides in the lake.

Detroit Lake offers year-round fishing in still water and not in or near the rivers and streams.  It is one of 32 lakes federally designated for recreation, managed by the United States Forest Service.
The lake serves many purposes including flood control, water conservation, and recreation.

There are many camping and recreation opportunities at Detroit Lake. In 2009, a new winter boat ramp was constructed, making it possible to launch a boat safely during the winter months when other ramps are on dry ground.

Water levels

The water level fluctuates with snow pack, precipitation, and the water consumption of Salem, and surrounding areas.

In 2015 and 2016 low water levels in the reservoir impacted recreation, the operation of marinas and the economy in the Santiam Canyon.

See also
 List of lakes in Oregon

References

External links

 FLRCDL: Federal Lakes Recreation Committee for Detroit Lake website
 Army Corps of Engineers: Hourly Detroit Lake Levels
 Army Corps of Engineers: Plot of lake level for last 12 months
 Ghost town rises from drought-drained Detroit Lake

 

Reservoirs in Oregon
State parks of Oregon
Lakes of Marion County, Oregon
Lakes of Linn County, Oregon
Parks in Marion County, Oregon
Parks in Linn County, Oregon
Buildings and structures in Marion County, Oregon
Buildings and structures in Linn County, Oregon
Willamette National Forest